This is a list of number-one hit singles in 1974 in New Zealand, starting with the first chart dated, 25 January 1974.

Chart 

Key
 – Single of New Zealand origin

External links
 The Official NZ Music Chart, RIANZ website

1974 in New Zealand
1974 record charts
1974
1970s in New Zealand music